Adult Contemporary (also known as AC) was a 24-hour music format produced by Dial Global. It targets a general radio audience between the ages of 35–49 with soft rock music from the 1970s to right now. Artists featured on this network are Phil Collins, Maroon 5, Billy Joel, Rod Stewart, Kelly Clarkson, and many more artists.

Jones Radio Networks was recently purchased by Triton Media Group. Although "AC" wasn't affected by it, the satellite feed was relocated into Dial Global's portfolio. By 2020, it was no more as it was discontinued

Competitor Networks
Hits & Favorites by ABC Radio Networks

External links  
Adult Contemporary by Dial Global - Official Website

Mainstream adult contemporary radio stations in the United States
Defunct radio networks in the United States

Defunct radio stations in the United States